The Breda PG (Italian: Presa Gas, "gas operated") was a prototype automatic rifle manufactured by Breda.

The PG was a gas-operated rifle fed from a 20-round magazine. It was trialled by the Italian government and sold to the Costa Rican government. The Italian models were semi-automatic only and chambered in 6.5×52mm Mannlicher–Carcano, while the Costa Rican models were chambered in 7x57mm Mauser and had an automatic fire mode with a four-round burst limiter. This makes the PG the world's first burst-firing automatic rifle.

Around 400 of these Rifles were issued to Costa Rica while the remaining saw service in special forces.

References

External links
Modern Firearms

Machine guns of Italy
Semi-automatic rifles
Trial and research firearms of Italy
Breda weapons